The pale-faced bat (Phylloderma stenops) is a bat species from South and Central America.

References

Phyllostomidae
Bats of Central America
Bats of South America
Bats of Brazil
Mammals of Colombia
Mammals described in 1865
Taxa named by Wilhelm Peters